Outrup (or Ovtrup) is a town in Varde Municipality in the Region of Southern Denmark. The town has a population of 1,040 (1 January 2022).

Sport
Region Varde Elitesport formerly the Outrup Speedway Club is a speedway club southwest of Outrup, at the Outrup Speedway Center, Hennevej 35. They who compete in the Danish Speedway League.

References

External links
 Outrup website 
 Varde Municipality website 

Cities and towns in the Region of Southern Denmark
Varde Municipality